Selena: The Series (Spanish: Selena: la serie) is an American biographical drama streaming television series created by Moisés Zamora. It tells the story of Tejano singer Selena's rise to fame and the sacrifices she and her family must make along the way.

The first season was released on Netflix on December 4, 2020. The second and final season premiered on May 4, 2021.

Synopsis 
The story of the Tejana singer Selena Quintanilla, from her childhood to her rise to fame, along with the difficult and heartbreaking tough choices she and her family make to hold on to love and music.

Cast and characters

Main
 Christian Serratos as Selena
 Madison Taylor Baez as Young Selena
 Gabriel Chavarria as A.B. Quintanilla
 Juan Martinez as Young A.B.
 Ricardo Chavira as Abraham Quintanilla
 Brandol Ruiz as Young Abraham 
 Noemi Gonzalez as Suzette Quintanilla
 Daniela Estrada as Young Suzette
 Seidy López as Marcella Quintanilla
 Aneasa Yacoub as Young Marcella

Recurring

 Hunter Reese Peña as Ricky Vela
 Luis Bordonada as Johnny Canales
 Paul Rodriguez as Roger Garcia
 Carlos Alfredo Jr. as Joe Ojeda
 Julio Macias as Pete Astudillo
 Gladys Bautista as Vangie
 Bryan Arion as Ray
 Jesse Posey as Chris Pérez
 Rico Aragon  as José Behar
 Christian Escobar as Bill Arriaga
 Natasha Perez as Yolanda Saldivar

Guests
 Christopher Parks as Lee Ritenour 
 David Barrera as Hector
 Oscar Avila as Manny Guerra
 Casey Tutton as Jilly
 Catia Ojeda as Laura Canales
 Mark Atkinson as Denny, Selena's manager
 David Fernandez Jr. as David Kramer
 Joe Lorenzo as Luis Silva
 Giovanna Bush as Young Beyoncé

Episodes

Series overview

Season 1 (2020)

Season 2 (2021)

Production

Development
On December 11, 2018, Selena: The Series was ordered to series by Netflix. The series is produced by Campanario Entertainment with Selena's father (Abraham) and sister (Suzette), from a screenplay by Moisés Zamora for Netflix. It is based on the life of Selena, and is the version authorized by Selena's family, unlike El secreto de Selena, an unauthorized version by María Celeste Arrarás, which the family publicly condemned. Part one of the series was released on December 4, 2020. The second part of the series premiered on May 4, 2021.

Casting
The series stars Christian Serratos as the titular character. Deadline later reported that "Other cast members include Noemi Gonzalez (The Young and the Restless) as Suzette Quintanilla, Selena's sister and best friend, who learns to embrace her role as the first female drummer in Tejano music history. Seidy López (Training Day) will play Marcella Quintanilla, Selena's mother; and newcomer Madison Taylor Baez will portray a young Selena."  Ricardo Chavira and Gabriel Chavarria were to play Selena's father and brother respectively.  It was later announced the series would include Julio Macias, Jesse Posey, Hunter Reese, Carlos Alfredo, Jr., Juan Martinez, Daniela Estrada and Paul Rodriguez, Jr. co-starring in the series as the Quintanila family and various other important members of Selena's life. Macias plays Pete Astudillo, with Posey as Chris Perez, Peña as Ricky Vela, and Alfredo as Joe Ojeda. Martinez portrays a young A.B. Quintanilla, Selena's brother, with Estrada as a young Suzette Quintanilla, Selena's sister, and Rodriguez as Roger Garcia, a shy guitarist who was part of the group before Chris Perez became its guitarist. Additionally co-starring Johnny Jay Lee (NCIS: Los Angeles) and Fernanda Moya as the young man and woman respectively.

Filming
 
Filming began in early October 2019 in Baja California, Mexico in places such as Rosarito, Tecate and Tijuana. Christian Serratos revealed in an interview with the Los Angeles Times that she recently finished filming the show's second season - under the health and safety protocols of COVID-19 in November 2020.

Soundtrack

Commercial performance 
Selena: The Series Soundtrack debuted at number 8 on the Latin Pop Albums chart, selling 1,000 album-equivalent units during the week ending December 10, 2020.

Reception

Critical response
For part 1 of the series, review aggregator Rotten Tomatoes reported an approval rating of 32% based on 34 critic reviews, with an average rating of 5.35/10. The website's critics consensus reads, "Selena: The Series affections are obvious, but by not probing deeper into Selena herself it fails to capture the woman behind the legacy, settling for just-another-retelling of the charismatic star's life instead of something more." Metacritic gave the series a weighted average score of 48 out of 100 based on 9 critic reviews, indicating "mixed or average reviews".

For part 2 of the series, review aggregator Rotten Tomatoes reported an approval rating of 14% based on 7 critic reviews, with an average rating of 4.42/10.

Audience viewership
On January 15, 2021, Netflix announced that the series was watched by 25 million households for the first 28 days after its debut.

Awards and nominations

References

External links 

2020 American television series debuts
2020s American drama television series
2021 American television series endings
American biographical series
American drama web series
Cultural depictions of Selena
English-language Netflix original programming
Hispanic and Latino American television
Spanish-language Netflix original programming
Television series based on singers and musicians
Television series set in the 1980s
Television series set in the 1990s
Television shows set in San Antonio
Television shows set in Texas
Television shows set in Mexico